This is a list of state prisons in California operated by the California Department of Corrections and Rehabilitation (CDCR). CDCR operates 34 adult prisons in California, with a design capacity of 85,083 incarcerated people. CDCR both owns and operates 34 of the state prisons; it additionally operates California City Correctional Facility, a prison leased from CoreCivic.

CDCR operates a variety of other incarceration facilities, including fire camps and California Division of Juvenile Justice facilities. For more information on the totality of jurisdictions and facilities involved in incarceration in California, see Incarceration in California. For more information on the history, conditions, and demographics of California's prison system specifically, see Prisons in California.

Facilities 

Reception centers house incarcerate people incoming to the state prison system while they complete an evaluation and receive a custody score. After that, they may be transferred to another prison for longer-term confinement.

While all facilities have some level of education, treatment, and pre-release programs, reentry hubs provide specific reentry support to incarcerated people within 4 years of release, including cognitive behavioral therapy, job search skills, and financial literacy.

Retired facilities

Prisons in California 
 Eagle Mountain Community Correctional Facility, Eagle Mountain, California (owned and operated by Management and Training Corporation, closed in 2003)
 Deuel Vocational Institution, San Joaquin County, California, (closed in 2021)

Out of state facilities 
In an effort to relieve California prison overcrowding that peaked in 2006, CDCR began housing California prisoners in prisons in other states. In 2009, CDCR began to phase out its use of out-of-state facilities, and it stopped incarcerating people in out-of-state facilities in 2019. The facilities were:

 West Tennessee Detention Facility, Tennessee (owned and operated by CoreCivic, exited in March 2009)
 North Lake Correctional Facility, Michigan (owned and operated by Geo Group, operated by the Michigan Department of Corrections, exited October 2011)
 Red Rock Correctional Center, Arizona (owned by CoreCivic, operated by the Arizona Department of Corrections, exited in October 2013)
 North Fork Correctional Facility, Oklahoma (owned by CoreCivic, operated by the Oklahoma Department of Corrections, exited in November 2015)
 Florence Correctional Facility, Arizona (owned and operated by CoreCivic, exited in Feb. 2016)
 Tallahatchie County Correctional Facility, Mississippi (owned and operated by CoreCivic, exited in July 2018) 
 La Palma Correctional Facility, Arizona (owned and operated by CoreCivic, exited in June 2019)

See also
 Prisons in California
 Incarceration in California

References

External links
California Department of Corrections and Rehabilitation official website
 Ducky Sherwood's map of California prison facilities
 Prison Inmate Information

California

Prisons
Prisons